In Deep is the fourth studio album by Australian singer-songwriter Tina Arena released by Columbia Records in Australia on 18 August 1997 (see 1997 in music). The album entered the Australian ARIA Albums Chart at Number 1, on 25 August 1997, knocking Middle of Nowhere by Hanson off the top spot, making it Arena's second Number 1 album, to Don't Ask.

The singles released from In Deep were successful in most music markets, including Australia, France and New Zealand.

In France, In Deep peaked at Number 3 on the French Albums Chart, stayed in the Top 10 for 29 weeks, and spent a total of 79 weeks in the Top 75. In New Zealand, the album entered the RIANZ Albums Chart at Number 22, then moved up to its peak position of Number 16 the week after, then spent a total of 6 weeks in the NZ Top 50.

Overview
In Deep was recorded in Los Angeles, with production duties divided between Foreigner guitarist Mick Jones (who produced albums for Van Halen and Billy Joel) and David Tyson (who collaborated with Arena on Don't Ask). Arena stated the album is "essentially a live record", because concerts are what she thrived on; she also expressed that the album is "international in spirit" and that she did not want to make a record that sounded like her previous album, instead wanting to make a record that reflected her "growth as a singer, writer, performer and human being."

Several tracks were substantially remixed for international editions of the album, and the track listing was additionally expanded and altered, notably to feature Arena's duet with Marc Anthony, "I Want to Spend My Lifetime Loving You", and the titular song from the musical Whistle Down the Wind, which was released in the United Kingdom. French language tracks Arena recorded were also included on that region's release. In total, the album yielded ten singles across its various editions: "Burn", "If I Didn't Love You", "Now I Can Dance", "Whistle Down the Wind", "I Want to Know What Love Is", "If I Was a River", "I Want to Spend My Lifetime Loving You", "Aller plus haut", "Les trois cloches" and "Segnali di fumo"; the latter three were exclusively released within French-speaking markets. The cover for the Australian version is slightly different and paler; Arena is centred on the cover between white borders.

Commercial performance
In Deep entered at Number 1 on the Australian ARIA Albums Chart but sales in Australia were not as high as her previous album Don't Ask (1994).

The album debuted at Number 1 on the Australian ARIA Albums Chart on 25 August 1997, knocking Middle of Nowhere by Hanson off the top spot, making it Arena's second Number 1 album. During its fourth week in the charts, the album regained the top spot for two consecutive weeks. In Deep spent a total of three weeks at Number 1 and went on to spend a total of 60 weeks in the Top 100, re-entering once, and being certified triple platinum by ARIA. It was the eighth highest selling album in Australia for 1997 and the eighty-fifth for 1998. It was also nominated for three ARIA Awards in 1998 for Highest Selling Album, Best Female Artist and Highest Selling Single for "Burn".

In France, the album peaked at Number 3 on the French Albums Chart, stayed in the Top 10 for 29 weeks, and spent a total of 79 weeks in the Top 75. The album became the 11th highest selling album in France for 1999 and the 18th highest selling album in 2000. The album was certified triple platinum in France by SNEP.

In New Zealand, it entered the RIANZ Albums Chart at No. 22, then moved up to its peak position of No. 16 the week after. The album spent a total of 6 weeks in the Top 50.

In the United Kingdom, the album was not as successful as her previous top 20 album Don't Ask. In Deep peaked at Number 102, spending 2 weeks in the top 200.

The singles released from In Deep were successful in most music markets, including Australia and France. Released in July/August 1997, "Burn" reached No. 2 on the Australian ARIA Singles Chart—becoming Arena's highest peak in Australia—and also peaking in the top 50 in New Zealand and the UK. "Burn" also made history when it became the fastest-added Australian song of all time in radio. The song was nominated for an ARIA Award for Highest Selling Single (see ARIA Music Awards of 1997). The French version also included Arena's first French-language single, "Aller plus haut". The song became a huge hit in France, where it peaked at No. 2 for 6 consecutive weeks, becoming Arena's highest peak there.

Track listing

Personnel
Schuyler Deale – bass
Jeff Jacobs – keyboards, piano, programming
John Robinson – drums, percussion
Leland Sklar – bass
David Tyson – keyboards, piano, programming

Charts
In Deep has sold over 1.5 million copies worldwide.

Weekly charts

Singles
The following singles were top five hits.

Year-end charts

Certifications

Release history

References

1997 albums
Columbia Records albums
Tina Arena albums
Albums produced by Mick Jones (Foreigner)